Leem Lubany (born ) is an Arab actress. She is known for her role as Nadia in the 2013 film Omar, and for playing Gabrielle Joubert in the television series Condor (2018–2020).

Early life and education
Lubany was born in Nazareth, Israel to an Arab family. She was a senior at Harduf Waldorf School in kibbutz Harduf, when she made her professional film debut in Hany Abu-Assad's Omar.

Career
Lubany made her debut in Omar, despite having no acting training. The film was nominated for the Best Foreign Language Film at the 86th Academy Awards.

In 2014, Leem Lubany appeared in A to B and played the role of Salima in the comedy Rock the Kasbah.

Filmography

References

External links
 
 

1997 births
Living people
21st-century Palestinian actresses
Palestinian film actresses
Palestinian television actresses
People from Nazareth
Arab citizens of Israel
Israeli television actresses
Israeli film actresses
Waldorf school alumni